The Citadel Bulldogs basketball teams represented The Citadel, The Military College of South Carolina in Charleston, South Carolina, United States.  The program was established in 1900–01, and has continuously fielded a team since 1912–13.  Their primary rivals are College of Charleston, Furman and VMI.

1949–50

1950–51

1951–52

1952–53

1953–54

1954–55

Southern Conference record books do not include The Citadel's home games against Jacksonville NAS or Parris Island Marines.  The Citadel counts these two games towards its records, but does not count earlier road games against non-collegiate competition (Gibbs AAU, Jacksonville NAS and Parris Island Marines).  The result of this difference is that The Citadel counts one additional win and one additional loss for the 1954–55 season, while the Southern Conference does not.

1955–56

1956–57

|-
|colspan=7 align=center|1957 Southern Conference men's basketball tournament

1957–58

|-
|colspan=7 align=center|1958 Southern Conference men's basketball tournament

1958–59

|-
|colspan=7 align=center|1959 Southern Conference men's basketball tournament

References
 

The Citadel Bulldogs basketball seasons